Monte Gorzano is the highest peak in the Monti della Laga, in northern Abruzzo, central Italy. It is located on the boundary with the provinces of  Teramo in the Abruzzo region and Rieti in the Lazio region. The source of the Tordino is near Monte Gorzano (Fiumata).

See also
Parco Nazionale del Gran Sasso e Monti della Laga
 List of Italian regions by highest point

References

Mountains of Lazio
Mountains of the Apennines
Highest points of Italian regions
Two-thousanders of Italy